Lorene Zarou-Zouzounis (1958 — ) is a Palestinian-American writer and poet.  Zarou-Zouzounis writes poetry for all ages, prose, historical fiction for children & adults, short stories and science fiction. She obtained her associate of arts degree from City College of San Francisco, and continued her studies at the renowned Creative Writing Department at San Francisco State University.  She is described as being influenced by her heritage and has frequently written on subjects relating to the Middle East.  

Zarou-Zouzounis had her first poem published in a CCSF anthology, followed by her big debut, of three poems published in a SFSU anthology in 1990. First publication is a self-published poetry chap book in 1987, titled Inquire Within.

Zarou-Zouzounis has performed hundreds of readings in the San Francisco Bay Area and in other parts of the U.S., beginning in the late 1980's at Small Press Traffic Book Store with her friend and mentor, Lebanese poet, novelist, artist, Etel Adnan.

Poems published in anthologies: Undertow Magazine, CCSF-1978, Out of the Maze-Ink Magazine #5; SFSU-1987, Food For Our Grandmothers; South End Press; The Space Between Our Footsteps; Simon & Schuster Books for Young Readers; The Flag of Childhood-Poems from the Middle East; Simon & Schuster Books for Young Readers, War After War-City Lights Review #5; City Lights Bookstore & Publisher, S.F., A Different Path-An Anthology of Radius of Arab American Writers, Inc.; (RAWI); The Poetry of Arab Women: A Contemporary Anthology; Interlink Publishing Group; Heartfire-Second Revolutionary Poets Brigade Anthology, Kallatumba Press, SF, 2013; and Overthrowing Capitalism--Reclaiming Community-Volume 3, Kallatumba Press, SF, Overthrowing Capitalism Volume 5-Revolutionary Poets Brigade, Kallatumba Press, SF, Maintenant 13 & Maintenant 14-A Journal of Contemporary Dada Writing & Art, Three Rooms Press, NY.

Zarou-Zouzounis has been published in The Poetry of Arab Women: A Contemporary Anthology and in Heartfire-Second Revolutionary Poets Brigade Anthology.

Zarou-Zouzounis co-designed and taught poetry workshops in a public school for several years as part of a national Parent-Teacher Association (PTA) arts enrichment program. Zarou-Zouzounis was a producer and talk show hostess for an Arab themed local television show in San Jose, California.

Prizes/Awards:

Placed finalist for two poems entered in the 2011 Indie Writing Contest-- (Author Solutions, Inc., the San Francisco Writers Conference, and San Francisco University Partner for this contest.)

Contributing author with 2 poems- Winner of the PEN Oakland Literary Award. The Poetry of Arab Women: A Contemporary Anthology; editor Nathalie Handal, Interlink.

Contributing author - Winner of the 2010 ALA Best Books for Young Adults award.  The Space Between our Footsteps, selected by Naomi Shihab Nye, Simon & Schuster.

References

1958 births
Living people
American women poets
American people of Palestinian descent
Writers from San Francisco
City College of San Francisco alumni
20th-century American poets
20th-century American women writers
21st-century American poets
21st-century American women writers
Poets from California